George Frederick Curtis (3 December 1919 – 17 November 2004) was an English professional footballer and coach, who played as an inside forward.

Playing career

Arsenal
Curtis played as a youth for Anglo (Purfleet) before signing for Arsenal in December 1936. He spent over a year at Arsenal's nursery club, Margate, before returning to Highbury in February 1938; he made his Arsenal debut in a 2–1 win at Highbury against Blackpool on 10 April 1939. He went on to make only one other first team appearance during that season. World War II intervened that September and he spent the war serving in the Royal Air Force stationed in India, but also played over 50 wartime matches for Arsenal. He also appeared as a guest player for West Ham United later in World War II.

After hostilities ended he played 12 times in the 1946–47 season, but was sold to Southampton in part-exchange for Don Roper in summer 1947; in all he played 14 times for the Gunners, never scoring.

Southampton
Curtis had impressed Southampton manager Bill Dodgin who valued him at £10,000, in an exchange transfer that also saw Tom Rudkin arrive at The Dell, with Don Roper moving to Highbury.

Nicknamed Twinkletoes by his teammates, Curtis was a clever, nimble player, whose feints and tricks were appreciated by the supporters, although they often frustrated his colleagues. 'Soccer Star' magazine described Curtis as an "inside-forward-cum-wing-half".

During his five seasons at Southampton the club narrowly missed out on promotion to Division 1 for three seasons in a row; in 1947–48 they finished in third place, a feat repeated the following season (despite having an 8-point lead with 8 games to play) whilst in 1949–50 they were to be denied promotion by 0.06 of a goal, missing out on second place to Sheffield United.
 
After five memorable seasons at The Dell, he moved to the French second division. In all he played 183 games for Southampton, scoring 12 goals.

Later career
He then joined French team Valenciennes for a fee of £1,500 staying for a year between 1952 and 1953, before returning to see out his playing days as player-coach at Chelmsford City. Curtis' move to Chelmsford City was somewhat hindered due to a strike in France, but he eventually joined the Southern League side for 'a four-figure fee'.

He then embarked on a coaching course at Lilleshall working with Walter Winterbottom. His coaching skills were quickly in demand and between 1957 and 1961 he was a coach with Sunderland.

Management career

Brighton and Hove Albion
His first managerial position came in June 1961 when he was appointed manager at Brighton & Hove Albion. At the end of his first season in charge, Brighton were relegated from the Second division in last place. He stayed at Brighton until February 1963, when he was replaced by Archie Macaulay.

Coaching
There followed spells as coach with Cambridge University and Hastings, before taking the managerial reins at Stevenage Town F.C. from January 1964 until 1967. He then had brief spells coaching at Hull City and with San Diego Toros.

Rosenborg
He was appointed as head coach at Norwegian side Rosenborg ahead of the 1969 season replacing Knut Næss.

His first meeting with the Rosenborg players is legendary:
"This is a ball," Curtis stated whilst pointing to the round leather ball. "Don't go too fast, now!" Odd Iversen laughed.

Curtis introduced modern defensive football to Norway, with a flat backline 4–4–2 formation, pressure on the ball carrier and tactical focus. The 1969 debut season ended with a premiership title for Rosenborg, with Odd Iversen scoring 26 of the team's 36 league goals. Despite this success, both the club leadership and the spectators disliked George Curtis's defensive style and pressure was put on Curtis to play a more attacking style.

In September 1969, Rosenborg met Curtis's former club, Southampton, in the first round of the Inter-Cities Fairs Cup, with Southampton going through 2–1 on aggregate, the goals coming from Ron Davies and Terry Paine with Rosenborg's goal scored by Sunde.

Curtis was allowed to continue for one more season. Despite coming second in the 1970 league season, it was an anti-climax. The dynamic duo of Iversen and Harald Sunde had been sold to Belgian Division 2 club Racing Mechelen before the start of the season and with them went all of Rosenborg's attacking play. 18 league games later, Rosenborg ended up with an almost unbelievable goal difference of 15–5! At the end of the season, George Curtis was dismissed and was replaced by Nils Arne Eggen.

Norway national team
Curtis returned to England, but in 1972 he returned to Norway to coach the national team. During the Euro 72 qualifying campaign, Norway picked up only one point in six games, and in a World Cup qualifier against the Netherlands on 1 November 1972, Norway lost 9–0. The next year, they suffered a perhaps even more humiliating result by losing 2–1 against Luxembourg.

Under his management, Norway played 17 international matches  (of which only 3 were won) before he was sacked in June 1974. Again, he was replaced by Eggen.

Rosenborg (again)
Before the 1976 season, he was once again appointed as head coach at Rosenborg. After a car accident in which his Norwegian wife died, Curtis's focus shifted elsewhere and Rosenborg quickly ended up struggling to avoid relegation. A 0–4 defeat against Division 3 side Røros in the 2nd round of the cup sealed his fate: Curtis was released from his contract on 27 August 1976. Again, his successor was Nils Arne Eggen. His final coaching job was spent in Qatar from 1979 to 1981.

After football

He retired to live on the Essex coast where he continued to coach youngsters as part of the FIFA coaching scheme, remaining as passionate about the game as ever.

He died in 2004, reportedly spending the final years of his life living on his own in a caravan in Chelmsford.

Honours

Managerial
Rosenborg BK
Eliteserien: 1969

References

Bibliography

External links
Profile on Arsenal A-Z
Obituary in Southampton Echo
Saints Legends You Have Never Heard Of !: George Curtis

1919 births
2004 deaths
Military personnel from Essex
People from West Thurrock
Royal Air Force airmen
English footballers
Arsenal F.C. players
Southampton F.C. players
Valenciennes FC players
Margate F.C. players
English football managers
English expatriate footballers
Brighton & Hove Albion F.C. managers
Rosenborg BK managers
Norway national football team managers
North American Soccer League (1968–1984) coaches
English expatriate sportspeople in Norway
Expatriate football managers in Norway
West Ham United F.C. wartime guest players
Chelmsford City F.C. players
Association football inside forwards
Chelmsford City F.C. non-playing staff
Association football coaches
Royal Air Force personnel of World War II
Chelmsford City F.C. wartime guest players